The South Taranaki Bight is a large bay on the west coast of New Zealand, south of Taranaki, west of the Manawatu, north and west of the western entrance of Cook Strait and north of the South Island. The name is sometimes used for a much smaller bay in South Taranaki, between the mouth of the Kaupokonui Stream directly south of Mount Taranaki and the mouth of the Pātea River.

Approximately 18,000 years ago during the Last Glacial Maximum when sea levels were over 100 metres lower than present day levels, the South Taranaki Bight was a coastal plain which connected the North and South Islands, featuring rivers which drained into the Cook Strait (then a harbour) to the south-east. Sea levels began to rise 7,000 years ago, eventually separating the islands and connecting the Cook Strait to the Tasman Sea.

The bight was once a calving ground for southern right whales in winter and spring and early Europeans in New Zealand called it Mothering Bay after the large number of cow-calf pairs. However right whale numbers were greatly reduced by whaling and only a handful of cows visit regularly today. Pygmy blue whales were discovered off Cape Egmont in 2007 and the South Taranaki Bight was confirmed in 2014 as the only known feeding and foraging ground for blue whales in New Zealand, hosting a unique population of its own. Blue whales also frequent an area off Kahurangi Point in the nearby northern South Island.

See also 
 North Taranaki Bight

References

South Taranaki District
Bays of New Zealand
Landforms of Taranaki
Bights (geography)